The Reuben sandwich is a North American grilled sandwich composed of corned beef, Swiss cheese, sauerkraut, and Thousand Island dressing or Russian dressing, grilled between slices of rye bread. It is associated with kosher-style delicatessens, but is not kosher because it combines meat and cheese.

Possible origins
One origin story holds that Reuben Kulakofsky (his first name sometimes spelled Reubin; his last name sometimes shortened to Kay), a Lithuanian-born Jewish grocer residing in Omaha, Nebraska, asked for a sandwich made of corned beef and sauerkraut at his weekly poker game held in the Blackstone Hotel from around 1920 through 1935. The participants, who nicknamed themselves "the committee", included the hotel's owner, Charles Schimmel. Schimmel's son, who worked in the kitchen, made the first Reuben for him, adding Swiss cheese and thousand island dressing to his order, putting the whole thing on rye bread. The sandwich first gained local fame when Schimmel put it on the Blackstone's lunch menu, and its fame spread when a former employee of the hotel won the national sandwich 
idea contest with the recipe. In Omaha, Nebraska, March 14 was proclaimed Reuben Sandwich Day.

Another account holds that the Reuben's creator was Arnold Reuben, the German-Jewish owner of Reuben's Delicatessen (1908–2001) in New York City. According to an interview with Craig Claiborne, Arnold Reuben created the "Reuben Special" around 1914.  Bernard Sobel in his 1953 book, Broadway Heartbeat: Memoirs of a Press Agent states that the sandwich was an extemporaneous creation for Marjorie Rambeau, inaugurated when the Broadway actress visited the Reuben's Delicatessen one night when the cupboards were particularly bare.

Still other versions give credit to Alfred Scheuing, a chef at Reuben's Delicatessen, and say he created the sandwich for Reuben's son, Arnold Jr., in the 1930s.

Variations

Montreal Reuben

The Montreal Reuben substitutes Montreal-style smoked meat for the corned beef.

Thousand Island dressing
Thousand Island dressing is commonly used as a substitute for Russian dressing.

Walleye Reuben
The walleye Reuben features the freshwater fish (Sander vitreus) in place of the corned beef.

Grouper Reuben
The grouper Reuben is a variation on the standard Reuben sandwich, substituting grouper for the corned beef, and sometimes coleslaw for the sauerkraut as well.  This variation is often a menu item in restaurants in Florida.

Reuben egg rolls
Reuben egg rolls, sometimes called "Irish egg rolls" or "Reuben balls", use the standard Reuben sandwich filling of corned beef, sauerkraut, and cheese inside a deep-fried egg roll wrapper. Typically served with Thousand Island dressing (instead of Russian dressing) as an appetizer or snack, they originated at Mader's, a German restaurant in Milwaukee, Wisconsin, where chef Dennis Wegner created them for a summer festival circa 1990.

Rachel sandwich
The Rachel sandwich is a variation which substitutes pastrami or turkey for the corned beef, and coleslaw for the sauerkraut. 
 In some parts of the United States, especially Michigan, this turkey variant is known as a "Georgia Reuben" or "California Reuben", and it may also call for barbecue sauce or French dressing instead of Russian dressing. The name may have originated from the 1871 song "Reuben and Rachel".

Dinty Moore sandwich
The Dinty Moore sandwich is a Detroit variation which substitutes coleslaw or shredded lettuce and tomato for the sauerkraut.  It is sometimes on toasted white (wheat) bread instead of toasted rye and sometimes omits the Swiss cheese.  It is often a triple-decker sandwich.

Vegetarian and vegan versions
Vegetarian versions, called "veggie Reubens", omit the corned beef or substitute vegetarian ingredients for it, including zucchini, cucumbers, wheatmeat, and mushrooms. Vegan versions can use the aforementioned wheatmeat also known as  seitan, tempeh or mushrooms with non-dairy cheese, dressing and butter.

Kosher status
As a Reuben combines both meat and dairy ingredients in the same meal, it cannot be kosher. However, it is frequently served at kosher style restaurants. Kosher versions may be made using non-dairy imitation cheese, or substitute vegetarian corned beef, or omitting the meat or the cheese.

See also

 List of American sandwiches
 List of sandwiches
 Pastrami on rye
 Sloppy joe (New Jersey)

References

Further reading

American sandwiches
Ashkenazi Jewish cuisine
Ashkenazi Jewish culture in the United States
Cheese sandwiches
German-Jewish culture in New York City
Jewish American cuisine
Jews and Judaism in Omaha, Nebraska
Kosher style
Lithuanian-Jewish culture in the United States
Rye-based dishes
Cuisine of Omaha, Nebraska
Beef sandwiches
Hot sandwiches